San Pietro Mosezzo is a comune (municipality) in the Province of Novara in the Italian region Piedmont, located about  northeast of Turin and about  west of Novara.

San Pietro Mosezzo is divided into four frazioni (wards)—San Pietro (chef-lieu), Cesto, Mosezzo and Nibbia—and three hamlets—Cascinazza, San Stefano and Torre San Pietrina (San Pietro Mosezzo's industrial park). The Canale Cavour flows across the town.

San Pietro Mosezzo borders the following municipalities: Biandrate, Briona, Caltignaga, Casaleggio Novara, Casalino, Novara, and Vicolungo.

Main sights
 Parish church of  Saint Peter (16th century)
 Parish church of Saints Vito and Modesto (12th century)
 Parish church of Saints Quirico and Judith, at Cesto
 Parish church of Saint Lawrence (11th century), at Nibbia
 Farmstead Motta, whose existence is proven by a sale bill of August 2, 1380 between Gian Galeazzo Visconti and Antonio Pozzo which transferred the property of the lands of Vinzaglio

References

Cities and towns in Piedmont